Evergreen, Vol. 2 is the second album from the Stone Poneys, released five months after The Stone Poneys. It was the most commercially successful of the Stone Poneys' three studio albums.

Release data
The album was released in the LP format on Capitol in June 1967 in both monaural and stereophonic editions (catalogue numbers T 2763 and ST 2763, respectively), and subsequently, on 8-track tape (catalogue number 8XT 2763) and cassette (catalogue number C4-80129). In 1995, Capitol reissued the album on CD (catalogue number CDP-80129).

Raven issued a 27-track "two-fer" CD In 2008, featuring all tracks from this and the band's first album (under its 1975 reissue name, The Stone Poneys Featuring Linda Ronstadt), plus four tracks from their third album, Linda Ronstadt, Stone Poneys and Friends, Vol. III.

Notes on the tracks
In a departure from the first album, Linda Ronstadt was the lead vocalist on almost all songs, with only occasional harmony vocals. The exception is the title song, "Evergreen" (also released on the B-side of the album's first single, "One for One"). Kenny Edwards sang lead on "Part One", while "Part Two" is an instrumental. Both parts have a psychedelic rock feel and feature sitar playing (also by Edwards).

The album contains the band's biggest hit, "Different Drum", written by Mike Nesmith prior to his joining The Monkees. The Stone Poneys' version went to No. 12 on Billboard's Hot 100 chart (with 'featuring Linda Ronstadt' on the single label; she was the only band member on the track). As Edwards recalled, the band based their original recording of the song on a version by The Greenbriar Boys from their 1966 album Better Late than Never!: "We cut a version very much like that, with mandolin, kind of a jug bandy, bluegrass-lite version." Record producer Nik Venet, sensing that the song could be a hit, had Ronstadt re-record it with other musicians. However, "Different Drum" did not chart until November 1967, after the band's four-month tour to support the album; Edwards had already left the Stone Poneys by then.

The first single from the album, "One for One," did not chart. It was co-written by Austin DeLone, later a member of seminal country rock band Eggs Over Easy, a group credited with launching the pub rock movement in Great Britain.

Five of the songs were co-written by band members Bobby Kimmel and Edwards. Kimmel also co-wrote "New Hard Times" – with the unusual theme of examining the downside of '60s affluence – with Mayne Smith, a member of the San Francisco Bay Area's first bluegrass band, the Redwood Canyon Ramblers.

Many of the other songwriters featured on the album, like the Stone Poneys themselves, were struggling singer-songwriters on the Los Angeles folk scene. Steve Gillette contributed "Song about the Rain" and "Back on the Street Again", and sang harmony vocals with Ronstadt on the latter. Sunshine Company had their biggest hit with "Back on the Street Again" (reaching No. 36 in Billboard); and Gillette included it on his eponymous debut album; both versions were released in 1967. More than 30 years later, West Coast bluegrass band Laurel Canyon Ramblers (led by Herb Pederson) released the song as the title track of their third CD, in 1998.

"December Dream," the album's opening track, was written by John Braheny, who had a brief career as a singer-songwriter before moving on to other areas of the music business. Fred Neil recorded the song in the same general time period, although it remained unreleased until the 1998 double-CD compilation album The Many Sides of Fred Neil. Braheny also included it on his eccentric 1970 LP, Some Kind of Change.

Track listing

Personnel

Band members
 Bobby Kimmel: Guitar
 Kenny Edwards: Guitar, Sitar
 Linda Ronstadt: Lead Vocals, Finger Cymbals

Other musicians
 Jimmy Bond: Bass
 Dennis Budimir: Guitar
 Pete Childs: Guitar
 Cyrus Faryar: Acoustic Guitar, Bouzouki
 John T. Forsha: Guitar
 Steve Gillette: Guitar, Harmony vocals (on "Back on the Street Again")
 Jim Gordon: Drums
 Bernie Leadon: Guitar on "Different Drum"
 Billy Mundi: Drums
 Joe Osborn: Electric Bass
 Don Randi: Harpsichord
Sidney Sharp: Violin, Concertmaster
Norman Botnick: Strings
William Durasch: Strings
Jesse Ehrlich: Strings, Violin, Cello, Viola
Harry Hyams: Strings, Violin, Cello, Viola
William Kurasch: Violin, Cello, Viola
Leonard Malarsky: Strings
Stanley Plummer: Strings, Violin, Cello, Viola
Robert Sushel: Strings, Violin, Cello, Viola

Other credits
 Warren Barnett: Mastering
 Richie Unterberger: Liner Notes
 Peter Shillito: Compilation, Concept, Release Preparation
 Ian McFarlane: Release Preparation
Kevin Mueller: Release Preparation

References

1967 albums
Stone Poneys albums
Albums produced by Nick Venet
Capitol Records albums

Albums recorded at Capitol Studios